South Bay is a small hamlet on the southeast corner of Oneida Lake in the U.S. state of New York.

Hamlets in New York (state)